George Hamilton Combs Jr. (May 2, 1899 – November 29, 1977) was a U.S. Representative from Missouri.

Born in Kansas City, Missouri, Combs attended the Kansas City public schools, the University of Missouri, and the University of Michigan at Ann Arbor.
He served in the United States Navy in 1918, and graduated from the Kansas City School of Law in 1921.
He was admitted to the bar the same year and commenced practice in Kansas City, Missouri.
He served as assistant prosecuting attorney of Jackson County, Missouri from 1922 to 1924.
He was an unsuccessful candidate for election in 1924 to the Sixty-ninth Congress.

Combs was elected as a Democrat to the Seventieth Congress (March 4, 1927 – March 3, 1929).
He was not a candidate for renomination in 1928.
He served as delegate to the Democratic National Convention in 1928.
He moved to New York City in 1929 and continued the practice of law.
He served as special assistant to the attorney general of the State of New York in 1931.
Attorney for the Triborough Bridge Authority in 1933 and 1934.
He served as associate counsel to the New York State Joint Legislative Committee to Investigate Public Utilities 1934-1936.
He was appointed by President Franklin D. Roosevelt as New York State director of the National Emergency Council in 1936.
Radio news analyst, war correspondent, and writer 1937-1951.
He served as special United States attorney, Office of Price Stabilization for southern district of New York, in 1951 and 1952.
Television and radio news commentator 1952-1961.
Chief United Nations correspondent and news commentator for Mutual Broadcasting System from 1961 to 1971.
He died in West Palm Beach, Florida, November 29, 1977.

References

1899 births
1977 deaths
Politicians from Kansas City, Missouri
University of Missouri alumni
University of Michigan alumni
United States Navy personnel of World War I
Democratic Party members of the United States House of Representatives from Missouri
20th-century American politicians
Lawyers from Kansas City, Missouri
20th-century American lawyers